Kumar Tuhin is a career diplomat from the 1991 batch of the Indian Foreign Service who is currently the Director General of the Indian Council for Cultural Relations. Prior to this posting, he was Ambassador of India to Hungary.  Earlier, he was India's High Commissioner to Namibia.  Before joining the Indian Foreign Service, Tuhin worked for a few years in the Indian Railway Service of Mechanical Engineers.

Education 
Kumar Tuhin received his early education in Braj Kishore Kinder Garten, Chhapra during 1976-1977. He then joined the Netarhat Residential School in 1978 (now in Jharkhand, then in Bihar state). In Class 10 exam conducted by the Bihar School Examination Board in 1983, Tuhin secured the first place in Bihar. From 1983-1985, he studied at St. Xavier's College, Ranchi. He joined IIT Kanpur in 1985 in the Mechanical Engineering branch. Thereafter, he joined Indian Railways Institute of Mechanical and Electrical Engineering and worked for a few years in the Indian Railway Service of Mechanical Engineers cadre.

Career 
After training at the Foreign Service Institute in New Delhi, he was allotted Chinese as his foreign language. He served in the Consulate General of India, Hong Kong (it was then called Commission of India, Hong Kong as it was still a UK territory) from 1993-1995, during which he obtained his advanced diploma from the Chinese University of Hong Kong. Thereafter, he served as Second Secretary /First Secretary at the Embassy of India, Beijing from 1995-1999.

He subsequently served at the Permanent Mission of India to the UN Offices in Geneva from 1999-2002 looking after, among others, specialized agencies of the United Nations. He served in the Indian Embassy in Hanoi from 2005-2009, and as Deputy Consul General at the Consulate General of India in San Francisco from 2009-2012. The Indian Consulate General in San Francisco then had a very large consular jurisdictional area, covering states up to Hawaii, Alaska and New Mexico.

High Commissioner to Namibia 
Kumar Tuhin was appointed as the High Commissioner of India to Namibia on 23 June 2015. He completed his assignment in October 2018. During his tenure in Namibia, Mr. Tuhin laid the foundations for the establishment of a Centre of Excellence in Information Technology (CEIT) at the Namibia University of Science and Technology. During the visit of President of India to Namibia in 2016, Tuhin was the signatory from the Indian side of the MoU on cooperation between the Namibia Institute for Public Administration and Management, (NIPAM) and the Indian Institute of Management Ahmedabad. In Sep 2018, Mr. Tuhin was the signatory from the Indian side of the agreement between the NIPAM and the Lal Bahadur Shastri National Academy of Administration. India-Namibia economic relations received specific boost during his tenure.

Ambassador to Hungary 
Tuhin was appointed as the Ambassador of India to Hungary on 26 September 2018.  For his work in Hungary, Mr. Tuhin has indicated economic sectors as priority areas.

Ambassador to Bosnia and Herzegovina 
On 14 May 2019, Kumar Tuhin was concurrently accredited as the Ambassador of India to Bosnia and Herzegovina. He presented his credentials to Mr. Želјko Komšić, Chairman of the Presidency of Bosnia and Herzegovina.

Other Details 
In the Ministry of External Affairs (India), he has served  in various capacities including as Joint Secretary to the Government of India in-charge of Development Partnership Administration from 2012-2015. His responsibilities included the capacity building programmes of the government of India, including the flagship Indian Technical and Economic Cooperation (ITEC) scheme as well as setting up of Centres of Excellence in IT and Vocational Training Centres as also implementation of grant projects in some regions of the world.

Mr. Tuhin has attended a leadership programme at the Near East South Asia Center for Strategic Studies at the National Defence University in USA.

He speaks Hindi, English, Chinese and French.

Publication 
Tuhin has published an article entitled  “India’s development cooperation through capacity building” in the book “India’s Approach to Development Cooperation” published by Routledge, 2016.

References 

Living people
Ambassadors of India to Bosnia and Herzegovina
Ambassadors of India to Hungary
Indian Foreign Service officers
High Commissioners of India to Namibia
Indian civil servants
Ambassadors of India
High Commissioners of India
People from Bihar
Alumni of the Indian Railways Institute of Mechanical and Electrical Engineering
Alumni of the Netarhat Residential School
Year of birth missing (living people)